The following is the filmography for actor, director, producer and screenwriter Kenneth Branagh.

As actor

Film

Television

Narrator

As director

References

External links 

Male actor filmographies
Director filmographies
British filmographies
Filmography